Marquess of Headfort is a title in the Peerage of Ireland. It was created in 1800 for Thomas Taylour, 2nd Earl of Bective.

The Marquess holds the subsidiary titles of Earl of Bective (1766), Viscount Headfort (1762), Baron Headfort, of Headfort in the County of Meath (1760), and Baron Kenlis, of Kenlis in the County of Meath (1831), all but the last in the Peerage of Ireland. He is also an Irish baronet. Before the passage of the House of Lords Act 1999, the Marquess sat in the House of Lords as Baron Kenlis in the Peerage of the United Kingdom.

The family descends from Thomas Taylor, who came to Ireland during the 1650s from Sussex in England to oversee on behalf of Parliament the fiscal expenditure of Oliver Cromwell's campaign in Ireland and later undertook the duties of a cartographer assisting with Sir William Petty's project of mapping Ireland, known as the Down Survey.

Taylor's son also Thomas Taylor represented Kells in the Irish House of Commons and in 1704, he was created a Baronet, of Kells, County Meath, in the Baronetage of Ireland. His grandson, the third Baronet, also sat for Kells in the Irish House of Commons. In 1760 he was raised to the Peerage of Ireland as Baron Headfort, of Headfort in the County of Meath. Two years later he was created Viscount Headfort, of Headfort, in the County of Meath and in 1766 he was even further honoured when he was made Earl of Bective, of Bective Castle, in the County of Meath. He was succeeded by his eldest son, the second Earl. He was one of the 28 original Irish Representative Peers in the House of Lords. In 1800 he was created Marquess of Headfort in the Peerage of Ireland. His son, the second Marquess, assumed the surname of Taylour in lieu of Taylor. In 1831 he was created Baron Kenlis, of Kenlis in the County of Meath, in the Peerage of the United Kingdom. This gave the Marquesses an automatic seat in the House of Lords. Lord Headfort served as a Government Whip in the Whig administration of Lord Melbourne and was also Lord Lieutenant of Cavan. His son, the third Marquess, represented Westmorland in Parliament as a Conservative and also served as Lord Lieutenant of County Meath. His son from his first marriage, Thomas Taylour, Earl of Bective, also sat as a Conservative Member of Parliament. However, he predeceased his father and on Lord Headfort's death the titles passed to his son from his second marriage, the fourth Marquess. He was a Senator of the Irish Free State. , the titles are held by his great-grandson, the seventh Marquess, who succeeded his father in 2005.

As of 31 August 2017 the present holder of the Marquessate has not successfully proven his succession to the baronetcy and is therefore not on the Official Roll of the Baronetage, with the baronetcy considered dormant since 2005.

Another member of the Taylor family was Clotworthy Rowley, fourth son of the first Earl of Bective and younger brother of the first Marquis. He assumed the surname of Rowley in lieu of Taylor and was created Baron Langford of Summerhill in the Peerage of Ireland in 1800. Also, the Honourable the Reverend Henry Edward Taylor, fifth son of the first Earl of Bective, was the father of the Conservative politician Thomas Edward Taylor, who served as Chancellor of the Duchy of Lancaster in 1868 and from 1874 to 1880.

The family seat was Headfort House, near Kells, County Meath in Ireland.

Taylor baronets, of Kells (1704)
Sir Thomas Taylor, 1st Baronet (1662–1736)
Sir Thomas Taylor, 2nd Baronet (1686–1757)
Sir Thomas Taylor, 3rd Baronet (1724–1795) (created Baron Headfort in 1760, Viscount Headfort in 1762 and Earl of Bective in 1766)

Earls of Bective (1766)
Thomas Taylour, 1st Earl of Bective, 1st Viscount Headfort, 1st Baron Headfort (1724–1795)
Thomas Taylour, 2nd Earl of Bective, 2nd Viscount Headfort, 2nd Baron Headfort (1757–1829) (created Marquess of Headfort in 1800)

Marquesses of Headfort (1800), Baron Kenlis (1831)
Thomas Taylour, 1st Marquess of Headfort, 2nd Earl of Bective, 2nd Viscount Headfort, 2nd Baron Headfort (1757–1829)
Thomas Taylour, 2nd Marquess of Headfort, 3rd Earl of Bective, 3rd Viscount Headfort, 3rd Baron Headfort, 1st Baron Kenlis (1787–1870)
Thomas Taylour, 3rd Marquess of Headfort, 4th Earl of Bective, 4th Viscount Headfort, 4th Baron Headfort, 2nd Baron Kenlis (1822–1894)
Geoffrey Thomas Taylour, 4th Marquess of Headfort, 5th Earl of Bective, 5th Viscount Headfort, 5th Baron Headfort, 3rd Baron Kenlis (1878–1943)
Terence Geoffrey Thomas Taylour, 5th Marquess of Headfort, 6th Earl of Bective, 6th Viscount Headfort, 6th Baron Headfort, 4th Baron Kenlis (1902–1960)
Thomas Geoffrey Charles Michael Taylour, 6th Marquess of Headfort, 7th Earl of Bective, 7th Viscount Headfort, 7th Baron Headfort, 5th Baron Kenlis (1932–2005)
Thomas Michael Ronald Christopher Taylour, 7th Marquess of Headfort, 8th Earl of Bective, 8th Viscount Headfort, 8th Baron Headfort, 6th Baron Kenlis (born 1959)

Present peer
Thomas Michael Ronald Christopher Taylour, 7th Marquess of Headfort (born 10 February 1959) is the only son of the 6th Marquess and his wife Elizabeth Angela Veronica Rose Nall-Cain, a daughter of Arthur Nall-Cain, 2nd Baron Brocket. Known until 2005 as Christopher Bective, he was educated at Harrow School and the Royal Agricultural College, Cirencester, he became a partner in Bective & Davidson, estate agents. In 2003 he was living on the Isle of Man and at 8 Milner Street, London.

On 21 October 2005, he succeeded his father as Marquess of Headfort (I., 1800), Earl of Bective (I., 1766), Viscount Headfort (I., 1762), Baron Headfort  (I., 1760), and Baron Kenlis (U.K., 1831); he also became the tenth Taylor baronet (I., 1704).

On 17 October 1987, as Christopher Bective, he married Susan Jane Vandervell, daughter of Charles Anthony Vandervell, and they have four children:

Thomas Rupert Charles Christopher Taylour, Earl of Bective (born 1989), heir apparent
Lord Henry James Anthony Christopher Taylour (born 1991)
Lady Natasha Jane Rosanagh Taylour (born 1997);
Lady Alexandra Susan Katherine Taylour (born 1998)

Ancestry

See also
Baron Langford

References

Notes

Work cited

External links

Thomas Taylour, 7th Marquess of Headfort

Marquessates in the Peerage of Ireland
1704 establishments in Ireland
Marquess
Noble titles created in 1800